Lev Petrovich Steinberg (ru: Штейнберг, Лев Петрович) (Yekaterinoslav 3 September 1870 – Moscow 16 January 1945), was an influential Russian Jewish conductor and composer.

Born on  September  3 (15), 1870 in Yekaterinoslav (now Dnipro, Ukraine).

In 1893 he graduated from the St. Petersburg Conservatory . He took a piano course with A.G. Rubinstein and K.K. Fan-Ark, in the class of composition theory with N.F.Solovyov (previously studied with N.A.Rimsky-Korsakov), in harmony - with A.K. Lyadov ...

In 1892, during the traditional summer symphony concerts in Druskininkai, Grodno province, he made his debut as a conductor.

In 1899 - in St. Petersburg, he conducted operas at the Kononov Hall, the Mariinsky Theater . He worked as a symphonic and opera conductor in theaters in Moscow (1902), Saratov (1903), Kharkov (1910-1913), Kiev (1911-1914) and other cities.

In 1914, at the invitation of S. P. Diaghilev, he appeared in Russian Seasons abroad (Paris and London). Later he performed in Bern, Dresden, Leipzig, Berlin .

After the revolution, in 1917-1924 he worked in the theaters of Kiev (now the Kiev Opera and Ballet Theater named after T. Shevchenko), in 1924-1926 - in the Ukrainian State Capital Opera (now the Kharkiv Lysenko Opera and Ballet Theater), in 1926-1928 - at the Sverdlovsk State Opera House. AV Lunacharsky (now the Yekaterinburg Opera and Ballet Theater) and in Baku . Participated in the organization of theaters and philharmonic societies in Kiev and Odessa .

From 1928 he lived in Moscow. In 1928-1941 and 1943-1945 - conductor of the Bolshoi Theater and artistic director of the symphony orchestra of the Central House of the Red Army .

Among the completed recordings - the first in history full version of "The Tsar's Bride " by N. A. Rimsky-Korsakov [1] .

In 1937-1938 he taught conducting at the Moscow Conservatory (professor).

In 1943 he headed and created the Symphony Orchestra of the Moscow Regional Philharmonic, which he directed until the end of his life.

He died on January 16, 1945, in Moscow. Buried at the Novodevichy cemetery.

Compositions
 Opera Nine days which shook the world («Девять дней, которые потрясли мир»)

Recordings
Rimsky-Korsakov: The Tsar's Bride 1943.

References

1870 births
1945 deaths
Russian conductors (music)
Russian male conductors (music)